There are about 3,000 runestones in Scandinavia (out of a total of about 6,000 runic inscriptions).

The runestones are unevenly distributed in Scandinavia:
The majority are found in Sweden, estimated at between 1,700 and 2,500 (depending on definition). Denmark has 250 runestones, and Norway has 50.

There are also runestones in other areas reached by the Viking expansion, especially in the British Isles (Manx runestones, England runestones,  Scotland and Ireland)  and other islands of the North Atlantic (Faroes, Greenland, but not in Iceland), and scattered examples elsewhere (the Berezan' Runestone in Eastern Europe, and runic graffiti on the Piraeus Lion from Greece but today in Venice, Italy).

The vast majority of runestones date to the Viking Age and the period immediately following the Christianisation of Scandinavia (9th to 12th centuries). A small number predates the 9th century; one of the last runestones was raised in memory of the archbishop Absalon (d. 1201).
A small number of runestones may date to the late medieval to early modern period, such as the Fámjin stone (Faroe Islands), dated to the Reformation period. Modern runestones (as imitations or forgeries of Viking Age runestones) began to be produced in the 19th century Viking Revival.

The  Scandinavian Runic-text Data Base is a project involving the creation and maintenance of a database of runestones in the Rundata database.

Elder Futhark runestones
The vast majority of runestones date to the Viking Age.
There is only a handful Elder Futhark (pre-Viking-Age) runestones (about eight, counting the transitional specimens created just around the beginning of the Viking Age).
 Årstad Stone (390–590 AD)
 Einang stone (4th century)
 Tune Runestone (250–400 AD)
 Kylver Stone (5th century)
 Möjbro Runestone (5th or early 6th century)
 Järsberg Runestone (transitional, 6th century)
 Björketorp Runestone (transitional, 7th century)
 Stentoften (transitional, 7th century)
 Eggjum stone (8th century)
 Rök runestone (transitional, ca. 800 AD)
 Hogganvik runestone (350–500 AD)

Younger Futhark runestones

Scandinavia proper

Sweden

The number of runestones in Sweden is   estimated at between 1,700 and 2,500 (depending on definition).

The Swedish district of Uppland has the highest concentration with as many as 1,196 inscriptions in stone, whereas Södermanland is second with 391).
 Varangian Runestones – inscriptions that mention voyages to the East (Austr) or the Eastern route (Austrvegr).
 Ingvar Runestones – 26 Varangian runestones that were raised in commemoration of those who died in the Swedish Viking expedition to the Caspian Sea of Ingvar the Far-Travelled.
 Serkland Runestones – six or seven runestones which are Varangian Runestones that mention voyages to Serkland, the Old Norse name for the Muslim world in the south.
 Greece Runestones – 29 Varangian runestones that talk of voyages to Greece, i.e. the Byzantine Empire.
 Viking Runestones – Stones that mention Scandinavians who participated in Viking expeditions in western Europe, and stones that mention men who were Viking warriors and/or died while travelling in the West.
 Jarlabanke Runestones – a collection of 20 runestones written in Old Norse related to Jarlabanke Ingefastsson and his clan.
 Frösöstenen
 The Ramsund carving
 Sparlösa Runestone
 Rökstenen – the longest runic inscription in the world, located in the province of Östergötland in Sweden

District of Hälsingland
 Hälsingland Rune Inscription 21

District of Medelpad
 Medelpad Rune Inscription 1
 Medelpad Rune Inscription 18

District of Småland
 Småland Runic Inscription 99

District of Skåne
 Sjörup Runestone
 Hyby Runestones (DR 264 and DR 265)

District of Uppland
 Färentuna Runestones (U 20, U 21 and U 22)
 Broby bro Runestones (U 135, U 136 and U 137)
 Hagby Runestones (U 152, U 153, U 154 and U 155)
 Lingsberg Runestones (U 240, U 241 and U 242)
 Hargs bro runic inscriptions (U 309, U 310 and U 311)
 Snottsta and Vreta stones (U 329, U 330, U 331 and U 332)
 Granby Runestone (U 337)
 Näsby Runestone (U 455)
 Vaksala Runestone (U 961)
 Krogsta Runestone (U 1125)

District Östergötland
 Högby Runestone
 Kälvesten Runestone
 Ledberg stone

District Gästrikland
 Gästrikland Runic Inscription 7 (Gs 7)

Denmark
Denmark has a total of 250 known runestones.
 Eltang stone
 Jelling stones
 Rimsø Runestone
 Snoldelev Stone
 Sørup runestone

Norway
Norway has a total of 50 known runestones.
 Dynna stone (11th century AD)
 Fåberg stone
 Granavollen Runestone (11th century AD)
 Grindheim stone (11th century AD)
 Hønen Runestone (11th century AD)
 Klepp I Runestone
 Kulisteinen (11th century AD)
 Norwegian Runic Inscription 239
 Oddernes stone (11th century AD)
 Svingerud Runestone (between 1st and 3rd centuries AD)
 Vang stone (11th century AD)

North Atlantic

British Isles
 England Runestones – a collection of 30 runestones that refer to Viking Age voyages to England, from Sweden, Norway and Germany.
 Manx runestones:  26 surviving stones.
 Princes Street Gardens Runestone, Edinburgh, Scotland

Faroe Islands
 Sandavágur stone (13th century)
 Kirkjubøur stone (11th century)
 Fámjin stone (16th century)

Greenland
 Kingittorsuaq Runestone

Other

Germany
Germany has a total of 4 known runestones.
 Hedeby stones, Hedeby (10th century AD)
 Sigtrygg Runestones (934 AD)
 Stone of Eric (10th century AD)

Italy
 Piraeus Lion, coming from Greece and today in Venice
 Sanctuary of Monte Sant'Angelo, Apulia (South Italy)

Ukraine
 Berezan' Runestone, Berezan' Island

Image stones
 The Ardre image stones
 The Stora Hammars stones and the Tängelgarda stone, Lärbro parish

Modern runestones
A number of notable runestones of modern origin exist. Some of them are intended as hoaxes, their creators attempting to imitate a Viking Age artefact. Especially since the late 20th century, runestones in the style of the Viking Age were also made without pretense of authenticity, either as independent works of art or as replicas as museum exhibits or tourist attractions.

This concerns especially runestones found in North America. There is also a limited set of early modern runestones created after the end of the Viking Age but before the "Viking Revival".
 Kensington runestone
 Narragansett Runestone
 Oklahoma runestones
 Vérendrye stone
 Spirit Pond Runestone

References

Runestone
Runestones
Archaeological corpora